The Monument to Leo Tolstoy on Prechistenka was installed in Moscow in the courtyard of the State Museum of Leo Tolstoy (11, Prechistenka Street). Granite sculpture was made in 1913 by sculptor S. D. Merkurov. At the present place has been since 1972.

History 
In November 1910 the sculptor S. D. Merkurov removed the death mask from the face of Leo Nikolayevich Tolstoy. After that, he began to create a monument to the writer, who ordered from him a Moscow patron N. A. Shakhov. In 1913, a sculpture carved from Finnish granite was ready. According to the original idea, the monument was to be erected on the Miusskaya square opposite the private university building of A. L. Shanyavsky. However, the Black Hundred organization "Union of the Russian People" threatened to blow up the monument to the writer who was excommunicated from the church, so far as he was supposed to stand in front of the Alexander Nevsky Cathedral that was being built. As a result, the Moscow City Duma did not give permission for the installation of the monument, and the sculpture remained in the studio of Merkurov.

The sculpture was recalled during the years of Soviet power, and in 1928 the monument was erected in the square of the Maiden Field in the framework of the Leninist plan for monumental propaganda. In 1972, it was replaced by a more monumental monument of the sculptor A. M. Portyanko, and the sculpture of S. D. Merkurov was moved to the present place — to the museum of Leo Tolstoy.

In addition to these two, in Moscow there is a third monument to L. N. Tolstoy — before the so-called "House of Rostov" on Povarskaya.

Description 
The monument is quite generalized in its forms, which is typical of the pre-revolutionary works of Merkurov. The figure of the writer seems to grow out of a piece of red coarse granite. His head is slightly tilted. The writer is dressed in a wide blouse, his hands are plugged in the waistband.

References 

Cultural heritage monuments of federal significance in Moscow
1913 establishments
Monuments and memorials in Moscow